Chandonanthus is a genus of liverworts belonging to the family Anastrophyllaceae.

The genus has almost cosmopolitan distribution.

Species:
 Chandonanthus fragillimus Steph.
  Chandonanthus perloi Gola
 Chandonanthus squarrosus

References

Jungermanniales
Jungermanniales genera